In mathematics, the Cayley transform, named after Arthur Cayley, is any of a cluster of related things. The transform is a homography used in real analysis, complex analysis, and quaternionic analysis. In the theory of Hilbert spaces, the Cayley transform is a mapping between linear operators .

Real homography
A simple example of a Cayley transform can be done on the real projective line. The Cayley transform here will permute the elements of {1, 0, −1, ∞} in sequence. For example, it maps the positive real numbers to the interval [−1, 1]. Thus the Cayley transform is used to adapt Legendre polynomials for use with functions on the positive real numbers with Legendre rational functions.

As a real homography, points are described with projective coordinates, and the mapping is

Complex homography

On the Riemann sphere, the Cayley transform is:

In terms of the models of hyperbolic geometry, this Cayley transform relates the Poincaré half-plane model to the Poincaré disk model. In electrical engineering the Cayley transform has been used to map a reactance half-plane to the Smith chart used for impedance matching of transmission lines.

Quaternion homography
In the four-dimensional space of quaternions , the versors
 form the unit 3-sphere.

Since quaternions are non-commutative, elements of its projective line have homogeneous coordinates written  to indicate that the homogeneous factor multiplies on the left. The quaternion transform is

Evidently the transform takes  and takes .

Evaluating this homography at  maps the versor  into its axis:

But 

Thus 

In this form the Cayley transform has been described as a rational parametrization of rotation: Let  in the complex number identity

Inverse
Let  Since

Since homographies are bijections,  maps the vector quaternions to the 3-sphere of versors.

Matrix map 
Among n×n square matrices over the reals, with I the identity matrix, let A be any skew-symmetric matrix (so that AT = −A). 

Then I + A is invertible, and the Cayley transform

produces an orthogonal matrix, Q (so that QTQ = I). In fact, Q must have determinant +1, so is special orthogonal. 

Conversely, let Q be any orthogonal matrix which does not have −1 as an eigenvalue; then

is a skew-symmetric matrix.   The condition on Q automatically excludes matrices with determinant −1, but also excludes certain special orthogonal matrices.

A slightly different form is also seen, requiring different mappings in each direction,

The mappings may also be written with the order of the factors reversed; however, A always commutes with (μI ± A)−1, so the reordering does not affect the definition.

Examples 
In the 2×2 case, we have

The 180° rotation matrix, −I, is excluded, though it is the limit as tan θ⁄2 goes to infinity.

In the 3×3 case, we have

where K = w2 + x2 + y2 + z2, and where w = 1. This we recognize as the rotation matrix corresponding to quaternion

(by a formula Cayley had published the year before), except scaled so that w = 1 instead of the usual scaling so that w2 + x2 + y2 + z2 = 1. Thus vector (x,y,z) is the unit axis of rotation scaled by tan θ⁄2. Again excluded are 180° rotations, which in this case are all Q which are symmetric (so that QT = Q).

Other matrices 
One can extend the mapping to complex matrices by substituting "unitary" for "orthogonal" and "skew-Hermitian" for "skew-symmetric", the difference being that the transpose (·T) is replaced by the conjugate transpose (·H). This is consistent with replacing the standard real inner product with the standard complex inner product. In fact, one may extend the definition further with choices of adjoint other than transpose or conjugate transpose.

Formally, the definition only requires some invertibility, so one can substitute for Q any matrix M whose eigenvalues do not include −1. For example,

Note that A is skew-symmetric (respectively, skew-Hermitian) if and only if Q is orthogonal (respectively, unitary) with no eigenvalue −1.

Operator map 
An infinite-dimensional version of an inner product space is a Hilbert space, and one can no longer speak of matrices. However, matrices are merely representations of linear operators, and these can be used. So, generalizing both the matrix mapping and the complex plane mapping, one may define a Cayley transform of operators.

Here the domain of U, dom U, is (A+iI) dom A. See self-adjoint operator for further details.

See also 
 Bilinear transform
 Extensions of symmetric operators

References 

 Sterling K. Berberian (1974) Lectures in Functional Analysis and Operator Theory, Graduate Texts in Mathematics #15, pages 278, 281, Springer-Verlag 
 ; reprinted as article 52 (pp. 332–336) in 
 Lokenath Debnath & Piotr Mikusiński (1990) Introduction to Hilbert Spaces with Applications, page 213, Academic Press 

 Gilbert Helmberg (1969) Introduction to Spectral Theory in Hilbert Space, page 288, § 38: The Cayley Transform, Applied Mathematics and Mechanics #6, North Holland
 Henry Ricardo (2010) A Modern Introduction to Linear Algebra, page 504, CRC Press  .

External links 
 

 ; translated from the Russian 

Conformal mappings
Transforms

ru:Преобразование Мёбиуса#Примеры